

Lake Smaller Ritsa, located in Abkhazia, north-western Georgia, is a lake in the Caucasus Mountains, surrounded by mixed mountain forests and subalpine meadows.

Geography 
The lake located at the Pshegishkha (2217 m) mountain bottom at the height of 1235 m, to the east from Gagra Ridge in the Iupshara River basin, 5 kilometers to the west from the lake Big Ritsa. Feeds by snow, rain and underground water. The length of the Smaller Ritsa is 530 m and the width is 290 m. Maximum depth of the lake is 76 m. In the lake lives trout.

See also 
 Lake Ritsa
Ritsa Strict Nature Reserve

Sources 
 I. Abkhazava, Georgian Soviet Encyclopedia, T. 7, p. 709, Tbilisi., 1984 year.

References 

Mountain lakes
Lakes of Abkhazia
Lakes of Georgia (country)